Bhagwatgarh is a village in the southwest of Sawai Madhopur District in Rajasthan state of India. It is surrounded by a continuous series of mountains from the south-west and river Banas from the north-west.

Its population is 11000, according to Census 2007. 85% of them are dependent on agriculture.

Bhagwatgarh is named on the name of the king of Bhagwat Singh, who was Commander of king hammir dev chauhan of ranthmbhor, hammir appoint bhagwatsingh as fevdral lord of bhagwatgarh 
Bhagwatgarh was first grade theekana of ranthmbhor

King built a great fort on the highest peak of village

The fort is located on 450m elevation
The route of fort from village was too smooth during regime of bhagwatsingh
But now it is critical
Bhagwatsingh built a sub fort for the Residence of his soldiers named as "CHOPAD DYA"
 
And also built a tank 
Which is the indication of his water harvesting ideology

Later on when
Allahuddin khilji attacked on ranthmbhor fort, then bhagwatsingh went for supporting king hammir and did kesariya along with hammir for ranthmbhor fort..... 
 Since then. Bhagwatgarh fort is kingless
Bhagwatgarh fort is a very good example of  hill fort
It is located on very good strategic Location.... 
We can see swai madhopur District from the top elevation of this fort. 
This is Unbelievable but it is of 9 floors, in which 7 floors are situated in the basement.... Wher king use ti kept his Treasury, and food in different floor, in the basement of this fort there is another route of exit in the difficult condition..... 
Because of unsung glory of this fort... Nobody look after of this fort... And day by day..... The route of this fort became too critical......

Notable spots
Notable spots include Sapt-Kund, Temple of Bhagwan KeshavRai, Areneshwer Mahadev Temple, and Kheda Pati Balaji temple. In Sapt Kund there are seven kunds, each with a specific purpose.

1.Arneshwar mahadev mandir
2.Bhagwatgarh fort
3.chopad dya dort
4.lal medi fort
5.kesaw rai temple
6.Kheda ka balaji temple
7.ghati ka balaji temple

References

Villages in Sawai Madhopur district